The 2016 Malaysia Masters Grand Prix Gold was the first grand prix's badminton tournament of the 2016 BWF Grand Prix and Grand Prix Gold. The tournament was held at the SPICE Indoor Stadium in Penang, Malaysia from 19–24 January 2016 and had a total purse of $120,000.

Men's singles

Seeds

  Lee Chong Wei (champion)
  Srikanth Kidambi (semifinals)
  Tommy Sugiarto (semifinals)
  Son Wan-ho (first round)
  Hu Yun (second round)
  Parupalli Kashyap (withdrawn)
  Wei Nan (third round)
  Ng Ka Long (quarterfinals)
  H. S. Prannoy (withdrawn)
  Ajay Jayaram (quarterfinals)
  Lee Dong-keun (third round)
  Sho Sasaki (first round)
  Hsu Jen-hao (second round)
  Jeon Hyeok-jin (second round)
  Wong Wing Ki (first round)
  Boonsak Ponsana (third round)

Finals

Top half

Section 1

Section 2

Section 3

Section 4

Bottom half

Section 5

Section 6

Section 7

Section 8

Women's singles

Seeds

  Sung Ji-hyun (semifinals)
  Akane Yamaguchi (first round)
  P. V. Sindhu (champion)
  Bae Yeon-ju (quarterfinals)
  Sayaka Sato (quarterfinals)
  Minatsu Mitani (first round)
  Yui Hashimoto (semifinals)
  Busanan Ongbumrungpan (quarterfinals)

Finals

Top half

Section 1

Section 2

Bottom half

Section 3

Section 4

Men's doubles

Seeds

  Kim Gi-jung / Kim Sa-rang (semifinals)
  Mads Conrad-Petersen / Mads Pieler Kolding (withdrawn)
  Ko Sung-hyun / Shin Baek-cheol (second round)
  Angga Pratama / Ricky Karanda Suwardi (withdrawn)
  Vladimir Ivanov / Ivan Sozonov (quarterfinals)
  Liu Xiaolong / Qiu Zihan (first round)
  Li Junhui / Liu Yuchen (first round)
  Lee Sheng-mu / Tsai Chia-hsin (quarterfinals)

Finals

Top half

Section 1

Section 2

Bottom half

Section 3

Section 4

Women's doubles

Seeds

  Misaki Matsutomo / Ayaka Takahashi (champion)
  Chang Ye-na / Lee So-hee (semifinals)
  Jung Kyung-eun / Shin Seung-chan (first round)
  Naoko Fukuman / Kurumi Yonao (quarterfinals)
  Tian Qing / Zhao Yunlei (withdrawn)
  Tang Yuanting / Yu Yang (final)
  Eefje Muskens / Selena Piek (second round)
  Vivian Hoo Kah Mun / Woon Khe Wei (second round)

Finals

Top half

Section 1

Section 2

Bottom half

Section 3

Section 4

Mixed doubles

Seeds

  Tontowi Ahmad / Liliyana Natsir (first round)
  Ko Sung-hyun / Kim Ha-na (withdrawn)
  Praveen Jordan / Debby Susanto (first round)
  Lee Chun Hei / Chau Hoi Wah (semifinals)
  Shin Baek-cheol / Chae Yoo-jung (quarterfinals)
  Choi Sol-gyu / Eom Hye-won (second round)
  Jacco Arends / Selena Piek (first round)
  Chan Peng Soon / Goh Liu Ying (semifinals)

Finals

Top half

Section 1

Section 2

Bottom half

Section 3

Section 4

References

External links 
 Tournament Link

Malaysia Masters
Malaysia
Malaysia Masters Grand Prix Gold
Penang